Henganofi District is a district of the Eastern Highlands Province in Papua New Guinea. It has four local levels of government(LLGs) headed by a president who is normally elected by the LLG's wards or villages council representatives. The four LLGs are Dunantina, Fayantina, Kafentina and Kamanontina. Its capital is Henganofi.

Districts of Eastern Highlands Province